Mel Watkins (born March 8, 1940) is an American critic and author. A former staff member at The New York Times, he has written extensively about comedy and African-American literature and has often appeared as a commentator in television documentaries about entertainment history and performers such as Chris Rock and Richard Pryor.

Biography
Watkins joined the New York Times in 1964 and, in 1966, became the first African-American editor at the Times Sunday Book Review, where he worked until 1985. He contributed numerous book reviews and articles on literature, sports, and entertainment as well as obituaries of artists and writers ranging from George Carlin, Richard Pryor and Rodney Dangerfield to Gwendolyn Brooks. He was the Book Page editor for Penthouse (1977–1978) and American Visions (1986–1991) magazines. In 1979, he was the recipient of an Alicia Patterson journalism fellowship; his research on African-American humor led to publication of the highly acclaimed social history, On the Real Side: Laughing, Lying and Signifying–The Underground Tradition of African American Humor That Transformed American Culture (1994). (A revised edition, On the Real Side: A History of African American Comedy, was published in 1999.)

Watkins first published book was Black Review (1971); the paperback literary anthology, which he edited, included contributions by Julius Lester, Cecil Brown, Nikki Giovanni, and others. Subsequent books include Dancing with Strangers: A Memoir (1998), The Bob Love Story (2000), and African American Humor: The Best Black Comedy from Slavery to Today (2002). His latest book is Stepin Fetchit: The Life and Times of Lincoln Perry (2005), a biography of the pioneer African-American motion picture actor.

Watkins, who was born in Memphis, Tennessee, and grew up in Youngstown, Ohio, now lives in New York City, where he continues to write, lecture, and appear for speaking engagements. A graduate of Colgate University (1962) who is listed among its Distinguished Alumni, he has been the NEH Professor of Humanities in the English department at the university since 2007 .

Bibliography
 Black Review No. 1 (1971), Editor
 To Be a Black Woman: Portraits in Fact and Fiction (1971), Editor
 Black Review No. 2 (1972), Editor
 Race and Suburbia (Issues and Perspectives: A New York Times Resource Library) (1973)
 Howard University Press Library of Contemporary Literature—Introductions to first six volumes (1984)
 On the Real Side (1994)
 Inside the Minstrel Mask: Readings in Nineteenth Century Blackface
 Minstrelsy (1996)—Foreword
 Dancing With Strangers (1998)
 The Bob Love Story (2000), With Bob Love
 African American Humor (2002)
 Who Killed Tiffany Jones? (2002)
 Stepin Fetchit: The Life and Times of Lincoln Perry (2006)

References
 Dancing with Strangers (1998) Simon & Schuster
 The Alicia Patterson Foundation
 Google Search
 The New York Times archives (1965-1995)
 Colgate University
 Contemporary Authors Online (2007)
 A & E Biography of Richard Pryor
 Amazon.com (Books)
 Maynard Institute Biography
Mel Watkins, English Faculty, Colgate University 

1940 births
Living people
African-American writers
Writers from Youngstown, Ohio
Writers from Memphis, Tennessee
Colgate University alumni
American literary critics
American male non-fiction writers
21st-century African-American people
20th-century African-American people